ACA may refer to:

Arts and entertainment 
 A Current Affair (Australian TV series), an Australian television program
 Actors Centre Australia, a private dramatic arts school
 American Choreography Awards
 American Composers Alliance
 American Council for the Arts, now part of Americans for the Arts
 American Country Awards
 A.C.E (South Korean band)

Business 
 Alerting Communicators of America, an earlier name of American Signal Corporation
 Angel Capital Association
 Astronautics Corporation of America
 Australian Coal Association

Government and politics 
 Affordable Care Act, shorthand for the Patient Protection and Affordable Care Act, commonly called "Obamacare"
 Allied Commission for Austria
 Anti-Corruption Agency, a Malaysian government agency
 Australian Coal Association
 Australian Communications Authority

Historical
 Army Comrades Association, or "Blueshirts", a political organization in 1930s Ireland
 Armed Peasant Association, also known as Armed Campesino Group, a Marxist–Leninist Paraguayan rebel group

Organizations 
 Academic Cooperation Association, international body to promote cooperation in higher education, based in Brussels
 Adult Children of Alcoholics, counseling and support group
 Aero Club of America, US aviation group, now the National Aeronautic Association
 American Cadet Alliance, former non-government group for military cadet activities
 American Chess Association, chess organization founded in 1857 and dissolved a few years later
 American Citizens Abroad, non-profit group advocating for American expatriates
 American Cryptogram Association, group for cryptographic puzzles
 American Crystallographic Association, scientific society
 Amputee Coalition of America, advocacy and support group
 Analytica Chimica Acta, scientific journal
Anti-Communist Action, a far-right organization
NSC-131, a neo-Nazi group
 Anglican Church in America, traditionalist Anglican church body
 Army Comrades Association ("Blueshirts"), Irish militant right-wing group in 1932-1933
 Association of Canadian Archivists, professional group for Canadian historical archivists
 Atheist Community of Austin, Texas non-profit group which produces The Atheist Experience TV program
 Automóvil Club Argentino, Argentina's largest automobile association
 Automobile Club of America

Professional associations 
 ACA International, formerly the American Collectors Association
 American Callers Association, association of square dance callers
 American Camp Association, professional and trade association for summer (and similar) camp owners and workers
 American Chiropractic Association, professional association
 Australian Counselling Association, professional association
 American Counseling Association, professional association
 American Correctional Association, professional and trade association for prisons and prison officials and employees
 Australasian Corrosion Association, Australia and New Zealand trade association
 Austrian Cockpit Association, professional pilot organization
 American College of Apothecaries, professional and trade association for independent community pharmacists

School 
 Academic Cooperation Association, international group promoting cooperation in higher education, based in Brussels

Science and technology 
 7-ACA, 7-aminocephalosporanic acid
 ACA, a codon for the amino acid threonine
 Advisory Committee for Aeronautics
 Anterior cerebral artery
 Anti-cardiolipin antibodies
 Anti-centromere antibodies
 Acrodermatitis chronica atrophicans
 Agile Combat Aircraft, forerunner to the British Aerospace EAP technology demonstrator aircraft
ACA0, an axiom system in reverse mathematics

Sport 
 Adventure Cycling Association
 African Cricket Association
 American Canoe Association
 Argentine Cricket Association
 Australian Cricketers' Association
 AC Ajaccio, a French professional football team
 AC Arles-Avignon, a French professional football team
 Absolute Championship Akhmat, a mixed martial arts, kickboxing and Brazilian jiu-jitsu promotion based in Russia

Transport 
 Air Canada, by ICAO airline designator
 Antioch–Pittsburg (Amtrak station), by station code, in Antioch-Pittsburg, California
 Arctic Control Area, a Canadian airspace region
 Atlantic Coast Airlines, later Independence Air
 General Juan N. Álvarez International Airport, by IATA location identifier, in Acapulco, Guerrero, Mexico

Other uses
 aca, the ISO 639 code for the Achawa language of Colombia
 Arabic chat alphabet

See also 

 
 
 
 Aka (disambiguation)
 ACKA